Goon is a 2011 Canadian sports comedy film directed by Michael Dowse, written by Jay Baruchel and Evan Goldberg, and starring Seann William Scott, Liev Schreiber, Jay Baruchel, Alison Pill, Marc-André Grondin, Kim Coates and Eugene Levy. The film concerns the exceedingly nice but somewhat dimwitted Doug Glatt (Scott), who unexpectedly finds personal and professional fulfillment after becoming the enforcer for a minor league ice hockey team.

Despite receiving largely positive reviews, the film was a box office bomb, only earning $7 million against its $12 million budget. After premiering on Netflix it became an unexpected success, leading to an increase in DVD sales and VOD downloads, ultimately resulting in a sequel being greenlit.

The sequel, Goon: Last of the Enforcers, was released on March 17, 2017, with Baruchel serving as director.

Plot
Doug Glatt (Seann William Scott), is a polite, kind-hearted, but dim-witted bouncer at a bar in Massachusetts. Doug feels ostracized from society, especially since his father and brother are both wealthy and successful physicians. Doug attends a minor league hockey game with his best friend Pat (Jay Baruchel). Pat taunts the visiting team during a fight and one of their players climbs into the stands, calling him a faggot. Doug, whose brother is gay, steps in and easily beats up the opposing player. Soon after, Doug gets a phone call from the coach of his hometown team, who offers him a job as an enforcer.

Meanwhile, veteran enforcer and Doug's idol Ross "The Boss" Rhea (Liev Schreiber) is demoted to the minors after serving a 20-game suspension for slashing an opponent in the head from behind. Three years prior, Rhea hit and concussed the highly skilled prospect Xavier Laflamme (Marc-André Grondin), who has had trouble recovering from the incident due to his fear of being hit again. As a result, Laflamme is still stuck in the minors, playing for the Halifax Highlanders. As Doug's reputation grows, eventually earning the nickname "Doug the Thug," the Highlanders' coach Ronnie hires Doug to protect Laflamme and be his roommate.

The Highlanders experience success with Doug as their enforcer, and he quickly becomes popular among fans and teammates, much to the chagrin of his parents and Laflamme, who loses ice time and the alternate-captaincy to Doug. Meanwhile, Doug becomes romantically involved with Eva (Alison Pill), a hockey fan with a penchant for sleeping with players.

With four games left on their schedule, the Highlanders need two wins to secure a playoff spot. On a road game in Quebec, after an opposing player concusses Laflamme with a heavy hit, Doug savagely beats the player unconscious and is suspended for the next game against Rhea and the St. John's Shamrocks. Doug encounters Rhea at a diner, where Rhea dismisses Doug's belief that he is a hockey player, insisting that they are both "goons". Though Rhea acknowledges Doug's physical prowess and gives Doug his respect, Rhea warns him that if they ever meet on the ice, he will "lay him the fuck out." The Highlanders, with Doug suspended and Laflamme hospitalized, lose to the Shamrocks. The aging captain of the Highlanders, an inexperienced fighter, challenges Ross to a fight, Ross offering a chance to back out but the player denies it, and Ross easily defeats him.

Doug reaches out to Laflamme and promises him he will always protect him on the ice; the incident touches Laflamme, who reconsiders his animosity towards Doug. In their next game, the Highlanders lead 1–0 thanks to strong teamwork between Doug and Laflamme. In the final seconds, Doug blocks a slapshot with his face and his ankle is injured in the ensuing scramble. The Highlanders win, but need a win against Rhea and the Shamrocks in their last game for a playoff spot.

Eva breaks up with her boyfriend to be with Doug, asserting that Doug is who she's really in love with. Doug later allows her now-ex-boyfriend to beat him up, believing that he deserves it for coming between them.

After two periods, the Shamrocks are beating the Highlanders 2–0. Rhea and Doug mutually agree to fight in the third period. Although Rhea manages to knock him down when Doug re-breaks his recently injured ankle, Doug refuses to back down and eventually emerges victorious, knocking Rhea's tooth out. Ross smiles at seeing his tooth, satisfied that he lost to someone he considered a worthy opponent. Eva and his teammates help a seriously injured Doug off the ice and Laflamme, inspired by Rhea's defeat, scores a natural hat trick, giving the Highlanders a 3–2 lead. As the game enters its final minute, Eva comforts Doug in the locker room as he comments, "I think I nailed him."

Cast

Production notes

The film is an adaptation of the book Goon: The True Story of an Unlikely Journey into Minor League Hockey by Adam Frattasio and Doug Smith. Footage from Smith's career as an enforcer is shown during the film's credits, and Smith said in an interview with Grantland.com that he is happy with the finished film. The book was discovered by Jesse Shapira and his producing partner David Gross. Along with Baruchel and Goldberg, they developed the script and then proceeded to package and independently finance the movie. It was the first film under their No Trace Camping banner.

Some scenes are based on actual incidents, such as Glatt scoring a goal off his butt. "Dangerous" Doug Mann of the Columbus Cottonmouths scored a goal in overtime of Game 5 of the Central Hockey League Eastern Conference Finals against the Huntsville Channel Cats, when the puck deflected off his butt scoring the game's winning goal, sending Columbus to the Finals.

Former NHL enforcer Georges Laraque has a small role as an enforcer for the Albany Patriots. His character fights both Glatt and Rhea over the course of the film. He draws with Glatt and the outcome of his fight with Rhea is not shown. When Laraque's character fights Glatt, the dialogue closely resembles the dialogue used by Georges Laraque in a fight against Raitis Ivanāns in December 2006.

Goon was filmed in Brandon, Portage la Prairie and Winnipeg, Manitoba. Most of the hockey scenes were filmed at the Portage Credit Union Centre in Portage la Prairie, which substituted for the Halifax Metro Centre, the home arena for the Halifax Highlanders. Other hockey scenes were filmed at the St. James Civic Centre in Winnipeg and Keystone Centre in Brandon. The MTS Centre was used for the home arena of the Quebec Victoires. The Hot Ice public access TV show was filmed inside Tec Voc High School's Broadcasting Media Arts department. It also featured Ricky, Bubbles and Julian from Trailer Park Boys, as control room staff.

Release

A red-band trailer for the film was released on IGN.

In Toronto and Montreal, prior to its premiere, posters for the film were removed from city bus shelters after several complaints from the public due to Baruchel making a "sexually suggestive gesture with his tongue and fingers."

The timing of the film's release was considered controversial by some as the previous summer featured the deaths of three NHL enforcers – Derek Boogaard, Rick Rypien and Wade Belak – all three of whom suffered from depression and head trauma that are believed to be factors in their deaths.

Reception

Critical response

On Rotten Tomatoes, the film has an approval rating of 81% based on 106 reviews, with an average rating of 6.5/10. The website's critics consensus reads: "Goon is a crude slapstick comedy with well-formed characters and a surprising amount of heart." On Metacritic the film has a weighted average score of 64 out of 100 based on 24 critics, indicating "generally favorable reviews".

Roger Ebert of the Chicago Sun-Times gave the film 3 out of 4 stars, and wrote: "The charm of Goon is that Doug Glatt (Scott) is a genial guy from a nice family. Just because he hands out concussions doesn't mean he dislikes anybody. He's just happy to be wearing a uniform."
Robert Koehler  of Variety magazine praised the performances: "The picture has a first-rate team of actors who visibly enjoy their roles and the sharp dialogue by Baruchel and Goldberg."
Stephen Holden, writing for The New York Times, gave a positive review that credits all the major performances.

Accolades

Goon was nominated for four awards at the 1st Canadian Screen Awards: Michael Dowse for Achievement In Direction, Jay Baruchel and Evan Goldberg for Best Adapted Screenplay, and Jay Baruchel and Kim Coates, both for Performance by an Actor in a Supporting Role.

Sequel

Baruchel wrote a sequel with Jesse Chabot. Michael Dowse was slated to return to direct but it was Baruchel who directed the film, making it his directorial debut. Evan Goldberg produced the sequel. The title of the film is Goon: Last of the Enforcers.

Baruchel expressed interest in the possibility of a third film, "I don’'t want to get into trouble, and I'm not saying there's going to be a Goon 3," Baruchel says, "but there's more than one way to skin a cat. We're not done in this universe yet."

References

External links
 
 

2011 films
Canadian sports comedy films
Canadian ice hockey films
English-language Canadian films
Films directed by Michael Dowse
Films produced by Don Carmody
Films set in Massachusetts
Films set in Newfoundland and Labrador
Films set in Nova Scotia
Films set in Quebec City
Films shot in Manitoba
2010s sports comedy films
2011 comedy films
Films with screenplays by Evan Goldberg
2010s English-language films
2010s Canadian films